(444 — 27 February 484) was the 22nd legendary Emperor of Japan, according to the traditional order of succession.

No firm dates can be assigned to this Emperor's life or reign, but he is conventionally considered to have reigned from 480 to 484.

Legendary narrative
Seinei was a 5th-century monarch. The reign of Emperor Kinmei ( – 571 AD), the 29th  Emperor, is the first for which contemporary historiography is able to assign verifiable dates; however, the conventionally accepted names and dates of the early Emperors were not to be confirmed as "traditional" until the reign of Emperor Kanmu (737–806), the 50th sovereign of the Yamato dynasty.

According to Kojiki and Nihonshoki, he was a son of Emperor Yūryaku and his consort Katsuragi no Karahime. Seinei's full sister was Princess Takuhatahime. It is said that the color of his hair was white since birth. After the death of his father, Seinei won the fight against Prince Hoshikawa, his brother, for the throne and so succeeded his father.

Seinei's contemporary title would not have been tennō, as most historians believe this title was not introduced until the reigns of Emperor Tenmu and Empress Jitō. Rather, it was presumably , meaning "the great king who rules all under heaven".

Seinei fathered no children; however, two grandsons of the 17th Emperor, Emperor Richū, were found—later to ascend as Prince Woke and Prince Oke. Seinei adopted them as his heirs.

The actual site of Seinei's grave is not known. The Emperor is traditionally venerated at a memorial Shinto shrine (misasagi) at Osaka.

The Imperial Household Agency designates this location as Seinei's mausoleum. It is formally named Kawachi no Sakado no hara no misasagi.

Ancestry

See also
 Emperor of Japan
 Iitoyo (Empress Tsunuzashi)
 Imperial cult

Notes

References
 Aston, William George. (1896).  Nihongi: Chronicles of Japan from the Earliest Times to A.D. 697. London: Kegan Paul, Trench, Trubner.  
 Brown, Delmer M. and Ichirō Ishida, eds. (1979).  Gukanshō: The Future and the Past. Berkeley: University of California Press. ;  
 Nippon Gakujutsu Shinkokai (1969). The Manyōshū: The Nippon Gakujutsu Shinkokai Translation of One Thousand Poems. New York: Columbia University Press. 
 Ponsonby-Fane, Richard Arthur Brabazon. (1959).  The Imperial House of Japan. Kyoto: Ponsonby Memorial Society. 
 Titsingh, Isaac. (1834). Nihon Ōdai Ichiran; ou,  Annales des empereurs du Japon.  Paris: Royal Asiatic Society, Oriental Translation Fund of Great Britain and Ireland.  
 Varley, H. Paul. (1980).  Jinnō Shōtōki: A Chronicle of Gods and Sovereigns. New York: Columbia University Press. ;

External links
Nihon Shoki Online English Translations. Scroll 15 – Emperors Seinei, Kenzo, and Ninken 

 
 

Japanese emperors
5th-century births
People with albinism
People of Kofun-period Japan
5th-century monarchs in Asia
5th-century Japanese monarchs
484 deaths